Tanagra is a municipality in central Greece.
 Tanagra figurine
 Tanagra (Gérôme sculpture)
 Bacchius of Tanagra
 Corinna of Tanagra
Tanagra (mythology)
Tanagra may also refer to:
 Tanagra, a mythical location in "Darmok", an episode of Star Trek: The Next Generation
 "Tanagra", a song by Matthieu Chedid from Mister Mystère
 Tanagra (machine learning), an open source data mining software for academic and research purposes
 Tanagra, an older synonym for Tangara (genus), a genus of birds
 Tanagra expositata, the white-tipped black or snowbush spanworm, a moth
 Tanagra Town, a location in Fallout 76

See also
Tanager, a bird family